Rebus: Long Shadows is a 2018 play written by Ian Rankin and Rona Munro. It is an installment of Rankin's Inspector Rebus series, written for the stage for the first time. 

The play received its world premiere at the Birmingham Repertory Theatre on 20 September 2018, before embarking on a UK tour.

The rehearsal script playtext was published by Orion in Hardback on 20 September 2018, coinciding with the premiere of the play.

Production 
The production is directed by Robin Lefevre, designed by Ti Green, lighting designed by Chahine Yavroyan and Simon Bond, composed by Garth McConaghie, assistant direction by Madeleine Kludje and fight direction by Alison de Burgh.

The play premiered at the Birmingham Repertory Theatre, running from 20 September to 6 October 2018 before touring to King’s Theatre, Edinburgh (8 to 13 October), Malvern Theatres (15 to 20 October), Theatre Royal, Nottingham (22 to 27 October), Manchester Opera House (29 October to 3 November), Royal & Derngate Northampton (5 to 10 November), His Majesty’s Theatre, Aberdeen (12 to 17 November) and Yvonne Arnaud Theatre, Guildford (19 to 24 November). It starred Charles Lawson as Rebus, Cathy Tyson as Siobhan Clarke and John Stahl as Cafferty.

The play continued touring the UK in 2019 beginning at the Theatre Royal, Glasgow (29 January to 2 February), New Theatre, Cardiff (4 to 9 February), Cambridge Arts Theatre (11 to 18 February), Theatre Royal, Newcastle (25 February to 2 March), Theatre Royal, Bath (4 to 9 March) and Rose Theatre, Kingston (12 to 16 March). Ron Donachie took over the role of Rebus from Lawson, after playing the role in the BBC Radio adaptations of the novels.

Cast and characters

References 

2018 plays
Plays set in Scotland
Inspector Rebus novels
Plays based on novels
Works by Ian Rankin